Robert Samber (1682—c. 1745) was a British writer and translator. He is credited with the first English translation of the Mother Goose tales.

He is also the English translator of the Fairy Tales of Charles Perrault.

References

External links
 
 

British writers
French–English translators
British Roman Catholics
1682 births
1745 deaths
18th-century translators